The 2005 CAF Champions League was the 41st edition of the CAF Champions League, the Africa's premier club football tournament prize organized by the Confederation of African Football (CAF). It was started on 29 January 2005 with a preliminary round. Al Ahly of Egypt defeated Étoile du Sahel of Tunisia in the final to win their fourth title.

Qualifying rounds

Preliminary round

 

1 Wallidan FC were withdrawn by the Gambia Football Federation.

First round

|Ajax Cape Town won 5–3 on penalties

Second round

|ASEC Mimosas won 5–3 on penalties

|Ajax Cape Town won 3–2 on penalties

Group stage

Group A

Group B

Knockout stage

Bracket

Semi-finals
The first leg was played on 24–25 September and the second on 15–16 October.

Final

Top goalscorers 
The top scorers from the 2005 CAF Champions League are as follows:

See also
2005 FIFA Club World Championship

External links
Champions' Cup 2005 - rsssf.com
Results/fixtures

 
CAF Champions League seasons
1